The Marriage Act is an Act of Parliament that was passed in 1955 in New Zealand and is administered by the Ministry of Justice. It repealed the Marriage Act 1908.

Forbidden marriages, those between relatives and relatives in a civil union, are detailed in Schedule 2 of the Act.

The Act led to some enactments by the Parliament of England and the Parliament of the United Kingdom to cease having an effect in New Zealand, the earliest being the Ecclesiastical Licences Act 1536.

See also
Marriage in New Zealand
Civil union in New Zealand
Same-sex marriage in New Zealand
Polygamy in New Zealand

References

External links
Marriage Act 1955 - text of the Act

Statutes of New Zealand
1955 in New Zealand law
Marriage in New Zealand
Marriage law
New Zealand family law